Svalbardosaurus is a genus of ichthyosaurs from the Lower Triassic.

The type species is Svalbardosaurus crassidens, named and described by Jean-Michel Mazin in 1981. The generic name refers to the Svalbard archipelago, of which Spitsbergen is a part, where the remains have been found. The specific name means "thick tooth" in Latin. The genus is solely based on some conical teeth and often considered a nomen dubium.

See also
 List of ichthyosaurs
 Timeline of ichthyosaur research

Notes

References 
"Biochronology of Triassic marine reptiles" Spencer G.Lucas

External links 
https://web.archive.org/web/20111006184511/http://paleodb.geology.wisc.edu/cgi-bin/bridge.pl?a=basicTaxonInfo&taxon_no=170940 

Fossils of Svalbard
Ichthyosaurs
Ichthyosauromorph genera